Sweden selected an entry for the Eurovision Song Contest 1987 by holding a preselection show named Melodifestivalen 1987. Out of 1,502 submitted songs and 12 songs in the final, the entry "Fyra Bugg och en Coca-Cola" was chosen. It was performed by Lotta Engberg, and written/composed by Christer Lundh and Mikael Wendt.

Before Eurovision

Melodifestivalen 1987
Melodifestivalen 1987 was the selection for the 27th song to represent Sweden at the Eurovision Song Contest. It was the 26th time that this system of picking a song had been used. 1502 songs were submitted to SVT for the competition. The final was held in the Lisebergshallen in Gothenburg on 21 February 1987, was presented by Fredrik Belfrage and broadcast on TV1 and was not broadcast on radio. The winning song's title was changed to "Boogaloo" for the Eurovision Song Contest as it contained chewing gum brand Bugg as well drinks company Coca-Cola in the title.

Voting

At Eurovision
As the song's title contained the trademark names Coca-Cola and the Swedish chewing gum Bugg, the European Broadcasting Union demanded that the lyrics be changed before the Eurovision final, so the song was renamed Boogaloo. It was drawn to perform at start position 12. After the voting, Sweden had received 50 points and finished in 12th place (out of 22). This was the worst placement for Sweden in eight years.

Voting

References

External links
TV broadcastings at SVT's open archive

1987
Countries in the Eurovision Song Contest 1987
1987
Eurovision
Eurovision